Johannes Althusius (1563 – August 12, 1638) was a German jurist and Calvinist political philosopher.

He is best known for his 1603 work, "Politica Methodice Digesta, Atque Exemplis Sacris et Profanis Illustrata". revised editions were published in 1610 and 1614.  The ideas expressed therein relate to the early development of federalism in the 16th and 17th centuries and the construction of subsidiarity.

Biography
Althusius was born in 1563, to a family of modest means in Diedenshausen, County Sayn-Wittgenstein (Siegen-Wittgenstein), a Calvinist County in what is now the state of North Rhine Westphalia (but was then the seat of an independent Grafschaft or County).  Under the patronage of a local count, he attended the Gymnasium Philippinum in Marburg from 1577 and began his studies in 1581, concentrating in law and philosophy.  He first studied Aristotle in Cologne, then studied law around 1585/86 under Denis Godefroy at Basel.  In 1586, Althusius received his doctorate in civil and canon law from the University of Basel. While studying at Basel, Althusius lived with Johannes Grynaeus for a period of time, with whom he studied theology.

After completing his studies, in 1586 Althusius became the first professor of law at the Protestant-Calvinist Herborn Academy of Nassau County. From 1592 to 1596, he taught at the Calvinist Academy in Burgsteinfurt/Westphalia.
He was married in 1596 in Siegen to Margarethe Neurath (born 1574), with whom he had at least six children. In 1599 he was appointed president of the Nassau College in its temporary location in Siegen, returning with it to Herborn in 1602. At the same time he began his political career by serving as a member of the Nassau (Germany) county council.

For the next several years, he was involved in several colleges in the area, variously serving as their president and lecturing on law and philosophy. In 1603 he was elected as a municipal trustee of the city of Emden, in East Frisia, where he ultimately made his fame. He became a city Syndic in 1604, which placed him at the helm of Emden's governance until his death.

In 1617, Althusius published his principal judicial work, Dicaeologicae.  In this work, he categorized laws into two main types: natural laws and positive laws, and argued that natural law is "the will of God for men." Althusius contended that terms such as "common law" and "moral law" were other names for natural law.  In order to know the true dictates of natural law, he argued, we must carefully study Scripture and tradition, as well as revelation and reason.

Johannes Althusius died on August 12, 1638, in Emden.

Political legacy
After his death, Althusius remained a controversial thinker.  His Politica was attacked by Henning Arnisaeus and Hugo Grotius during the 17th century for its defense of local autonomies against the rise of territorial absolutism and proponents of the modern united nation state. Interest in Althusius' theories continued into the second half of the 17th century, but Althusius was forgotten once the European wars of religion had ended. 

Althusius had published in the Latin language using fashionable Ramist logic. As time passed, his political canon was read less and the barriers to interpreting Althusian politics increased. In the second half of the 19th century Althusius was rediscovered when Otto von Gierke published research on Politica. In Germany, an academic society was founded to research Althusius and his times. At a time when Otto von Bismarck worked towards unifying Germany Gierke promoted Althusius' preoccupation with political order based on majority decisions, traditional European relationships, and negotiated agreements as a timely theory on procedural federalism. In 1871 most German states unified to form the German Empire under Bismarck's imperial constitution. Gierke's book on Althusian federalism went on to become a source of inspiration for pluralism in Britain, with John Neville Figgis and Harold Laski adapting Gierke.
  
In 1932 the German-American professor Carl Joachim Friedrich published a new, slightly abridged edition of Althusius' Politica. After World War II Friedrich helped to draft the German constitution, known as Basic Law for the Federal Republic of Germany, while working as adviser in Allied-occupied Germany. Friedrich praised Althusius for having written the first "full-bodied concept of federalism" and so generated renewed interest in Althusius on both sides of the Atlantic. In 1964 Frederick Smith Carney published an abridged English translation of Politica, exposing Althusius to a wider readership. In 1968 Althusisus was credited as "the real father of modern federalism" by Daniel J. Elazar.

Althusian federalism
Althusius saw confederations as feasible and successful cooperative constitutional orders. In his view, a confederation could be built on successive levels of political community where each community pursues common interests. A village was a union of families, a town was a union of guilds, a province was a union of towns, a state was a union of provinces, and an empire was a union of states. Althusius' understanding of society as a community of communities informed his views on the nature of politics and federalism (consociatio symbiotica). For Althusius the purpose of politics was the "science of those matters which pertain to the living together" and federations perfectly put the purpose of politics into practice. Althusius's federalism did not involve the surrendering of power, instead it rested on responsibly sharing power. 

Althusius became one of the principal European thinkers on federalism at the start of the 17th century while the European continent was ravaged by religious wars. Against the backdrop of the Reformation and the rise of absolutist monarchies, Althusius identified the German Holy Roman Empire as a commonwealth were the majority could decide matters for all. In reference to Aristotle, Althusius examined the confederate institutions of the Holy Roman Empire and established a theory of federalism where power is shared among autonomous smaller and larger political communities. Althusius was Calvinist and did not hold Thomas Aquinas's theory on the commonwealth in high regard. In 1603 Althusius published Politica Methodice Digesta, setting out his theory on building a federal political system out of political associations that were grounded in the free initiative of citizens. Althusius relied on the neo-Platonian idea of a universal brotherhood, thus he combined the Greco-Roman ideal of a association that was governed by reciprocal relationships with the Catholic Christian principled of subsidiarity. Althusius' teachings presented an alternative to the theories of his contemporary Jean Bodin on sovereignty. According to Althusus, natural law gave citizens the right to resist tyrannical government and sovereignity rested with the community, not the ruler. Therefore Althusius maintained that legitimate political authority was founded on smaller communities.

Works
 Civilis conversationis libri duo, 1601
 Politica, the first edition of which was completed in 1603, is considered not only the most fully developed scheme of Calvinist political theory, but also the only systematic justification of the Dutch Revolt. Althusius took from thinkers in various fields, including Aristotle, Calvin, Bodin, Machiavelli, Grotius, and Peter Ramus; Politica cited close to 200 books in all; the first edition of Politica was received with wide acclaim in Emden and in the Netherlands beyond. It may have been influential on American via Alexander Henderson.
 Dicaeologica libri tres, totum et universum Jus, Frankfurt, 1618.  Sections of this work have been recently translated into English and published by Christian's Library Press as On Law and Power (2013).

Bibliography
 .
 .
 Althusius, Johannes (2013) [1617], On Law and Power. CLP Academic.

Notes

References

Sources
 Althusius, Johannes, On Law and Power. CLP Academic, 2013.
Alvarado, Ruben. The Debate that Changed the West: Grotius versus Althusius (Aalten: Pantocrator Press, 2018).
 "Il lessico della Politica di Johannes Althusius", a cura di Francesco Ingravalle e Corrado Malandrino, Firenze, Olschki, 2005.
 Follesdal, Andres. "Survey Article: Subsidiarity." Journal of Political Philosophy 6 (June 1998): 190-219.
 Friedrich, Carl J. Constitutional Reason of State. Providence: Brown University Press, 1957.
 Hueglin, Thomas. "Covenant and Federalism in the Politics of Althusius." In The Covenant Connection: From Federal Theology to Modern Federalism, ed. Daniel J. Elazar and John Kincaid, 31-54. Lanham, Maryland: Lexington Books, 2000.
 Hueglin, Thomas. Early Modern Concepts for a Late Modern World: Althusius on Community and Federalism. Waterloo, Ont.: Wilfrid Laurier University Press, 1999.
 . "Federalism at the Crossroads: Old Meanings, New Significance." Canadian Journal of Political Science 36 (June 2003): 275-293.
 . "Have We Studied the Wrong Authors? On Johannes Althusius as a Political Theorist." Studies in Political Thought 1 (Winter 1992): 75-93.
 Kistenkas, Frederik Hendrik. European and domestic subsidiarity. An Althusian conceptionalist view, Tilb. Law Rev. 2000, p. 247 ev. https://brill.com/view/journals/tilr/8/3/article-p247_4.xml?crawler=true&lang=de&language=fr
 Lakoff, Sanford. "Althusius, Johannes." In Political Philosophy: Theories, Thinkers, and Concepts. Edited by Seymour Martin Lipset, 221-223. Washington, D.C.: CQ Press, 2001.
 von Gierke, Otto. The Development of Political Theory. Translated by Bernard Freyd. New York: W. W. Norton and Company, Inc., 1939.

1563 births
1638 deaths
17th-century Latin-language writers
Political philosophers
German political writers
Federalism
Calvinist and Reformed philosophers
German male non-fiction writers
17th-century German male writers
16th-century German jurists
17th-century German jurists